Mary Sawatzky (born February 7, 1961) is a Minnesota politician and former member of the Minnesota House of Representatives. A member of the Minnesota Democratic–Farmer–Labor Party (DFL), she represented District 17B in west-central Minnesota. She is currently teaching as a teacher of the deaf (hard-of-hearing) at Willmar Senior High School in Minnesota.

Education
Sawatzky attended St. Cloud State University, graduating in 1984 with a B.S. in special education and elementary education. She was a special education teacher at New London–Spicer Senior High School from 1985 to 1986. When she left her job later that year, she started working in Willmar Public Schools as a learning disability teacher until 2018.

Minnesota House of Representatives
Sawatzky was first elected to the Minnesota House of Representatives in 2012.

Sawatzky was one of two Democrats in the Minnesota House to vote against a same-sex marriage bill on May 9, 2013. The bill passed 75-59.

Personal life
Sawatzky is married to her husband, Douglas. They have two children and reside in Willmar, Minnesota. She teaches at Willmar Middle School.

References

External links

Rep. Mary Sawatzky official Minnesota House of Representatives website
Rep. Mary Sawatzky official campaign website

1961 births
Living people
Members of the Minnesota House of Representatives
21st-century American politicians